The River Till is a river of north-eastern Northumberland. It is a tributary of the River Tweed, of which it is the only major tributary to flow wholly in England. Upstream of the locality of Bewick Bridge, 8.5 km to the southeast of Wooler the river is known as the River Breamish. It rises on Comb Fell in the Cheviot Hills.

Its tributaries include Wooler Water, which originates in the Cheviots, and the River Glen in Glendale. 
It meets the Tweed a mile to the west of Twizell Bridge, 4 km downstream of Coldstream. According to local folklore:

Tweed said to Till
"What gars ye rin sae stil?"
Says Till to Tweed,
"Though ye rin wi' speed
And I rin slaw
Whar ye droon yin man
I droon twa"''

Recent environmental projects have included an attempt to conserve the native brown trout.

References

External links

 A walk along the River Till bank from Etal to Tiptoe
 Brown trout conservation project
 Local history
 Map sources for:  - source of the Breamish and  - confluence with the Tweed
 https://www.antonychessell.co.uk/Breamish and Till:From Source to Tweed, TillVAS,2014

Till
Till
1Till